Fabio da Silva Santos (born May 15, 1992 in Macapá), commonly known as Fabinho, is a Brazilian footballer who plays for Santos–AP as forward. He already played for national competitions such as Copa do Brasil and Campeonato Brasileiro Série D.

Career statistics

References

External links

1992 births
Living people
Brazilian footballers
Association football forwards
Campeonato Brasileiro Série D players
People from Macapá
Santos Futebol Clube (AP) players
Sportspeople from Amapá